Turquet's octopus (Pareledone turqueti) is a species of benthic octopus with a circumpolar Antarctic distribution. The species has a wide depth range, occurring from shallow waters to 4,000 m deep.

P. turqueti grows to 15 cm in mantle length. It is characterised by the absence of a skin ridge round the body, and its nearly smooth skin, which is covered with low granular bumps.

In the wild, P. turqueti is known to be preyed upon by Patagonian toothfish off South Georgia and Weddell seals off the South Shetland Islands.

The type specimen was collected in the Antarctic Ocean (65°S, 64°W) and is deposited at the Muséum National d'Histoire Naturelle in Paris.

References

External links

GenBank Links for Genetic Information on Pareledone turqueti

Octopuses
Fauna of Antarctica
Cephalopods of South America
Molluscs described in 1905
Fauna of the Southern Ocean